Nabil Haddad is a priest in the Melkite Greek Catholic Church and a leading figure among Arab Christians in Jordan. He is the founder and current director of the Jordanian Interfaith Coexistence Research Center (JICRC) in Amman, Jordan.

Biography
Nabil Haddad was born in a town near Irbid, Jordan.

For years, Father Nabil Haddad has worked to promote interfaith harmony between Muslims and Christians in Jordan and around the world.

Father Nabil Haddad has worked to implement the ideas behind World Interfaith Harmony Week, first proposed by King Abdullah II of Jordan in an address to the General Assembly of the United Nations on September 23, 2010.

See also 
Jordanian Interfaith Coexistence Research Center
Amman Message
Arab Christians

References

People from Irbid Governorate
Jordanian Melkite Greek Catholics
Living people
Year of birth missing (living people)
Jordanian religious leaders